Mammillaria plumosa, the feather cactus, is a species of flowering plant in the family Cactaceae, native to Northeastern Mexico.

The clustering spherical stems,  in diameter, are completely covered in white downy spines. White or greenish yellow flowers are borne in late summer.

Its status is listed as “Near Threatened” by the IUCN Red List.

Cultivation
Mammillaria plumosa is one of several Mammillaria species to be cultivated. In temperate regions it must be grown under glass with heat. It has gained the Royal Horticultural Society's Award of Garden Merit.

References

plumosa
Cacti of Mexico
Endemic flora of Mexico
Flora of Northeastern Mexico